Love and Duty is a 1916 American silent comedy film featuring Oliver Hardy.

Cast
 Oliver Hardy - Pvt. Plump (as Babe Hardy)
 Billy Ruge - Lt. Runt
 Bert Tracy - Col. Tracy
 Florence McLaughlin - His daughter (as Florence McLoughlin)
 Ray Godfrey - The sweetheart of the regiment

See also
 List of American films of 1916
 Oliver Hardy filmography

External links

1916 films
1916 short films
American silent short films
American black-and-white films
1916 comedy films
Silent American comedy films
American comedy short films
1910s American films